The 2008 All-Ireland Senior Club Camogie Championship for the leading clubs in the women's team field sport of camogie was won by Rossa (Ant), who defeated Drom & Inch (Tip) by six points in the final, played at Mullingar.

Arrangements
The championship was organised on the traditional provincial system used in Gaelic Games since the 1880s, with Ballyboden St Endas (Dub) and Athenry) winning the championships of the other two provinces. Jane Adams scored 2–11 in Rossa’s defeat of Ballyboden in the semi-final. Joanne Ryan sent a long ball in to Siobhán McGrath for Dorm and Inch’s winning goal against Athenry in their semi-final.

The Final
Jane Adams scored 2–9 for Rossa as they dominated the final.

Final stages

References

External links
 Camogie Association

2008
Club
Cam